Ralph Alanson Sawyer (January 5, 1895 – December 6, 1978) was an American physicist and a leader in American science.

A New Hampshire native, he graduated from the Atkinson Academy in 1911 and in 1915 from Dartmouth. He then went to the University of Chicago where, under the direction of R. A. Millikan, he finished his PhD in 1919, a time during which he also served as a scientific liaison officer in the United States Navy. At the invitation of Harrison M. Randall, Sawyer then joined the faculty of the Physics Department at the University of Michigan, an affiliation that he retained for his entire career.

At Michigan, he began by doing work in ultraviolet spectroscopy for studies of atomic structure; he also did much to develop industrial applications of spectroscopy. In later years, his talent for administration brought him to positions of scientific, military, and academic leadership that extended beyond his formal retirement from Michigan in 1964.

Sawyer was the civilian director of the 1946 Bikini atomic bomb tests, president of the Optical Society of America from 1955 to 1957, and was awarded the Frederic Ives Medal in 1963. He was also dean of the graduate school and vice president for research at the University of Michigan.

Sawyer died in 1978, at 83 years of age, in Ann Arbor, Michigan.

See also
Optical Society of America#Past Presidents of the OSA

References

External links
 Articles Published by early OSA Presidents Journal of the Optical Society of America

1895 births
1978 deaths
University of Michigan faculty
Presidents of Optica (society)
20th-century American physicists
Fellows of the American Physical Society